The Ven  John Russell Walker , MA  was an eminent  Anglican priest in the last third of the  19th century.

He was born in Bury on 18 June 1837 and educated at University College, Oxford. He was ordained in 1863 and was Curate of Middleton and then Walmersley. The following year he married Augusta Margaret Hornby  of Poole Hall, Nantwich. He was appointed a Canon of Manchester Cathedral in 1870  and then of Chichester in 1874. In 1879 he became Archdeacon of Chichester, dying in post  on 31 October 1887 after a short illness.

Notes

1837 births
People from Bury, Greater Manchester
Alumni of University College, Oxford
Archdeacons of Chichester
1887 deaths
19th-century English Anglican priests